The 1955 Men's European Volleyball Championship, the fourth edition of the event, was organized by Europe's governing volleyball body, the Confédération Européenne de Volleyball. It was hosted in Bucharest, Romania from June 15 to June 25, 1955.

Teams

Final ranking

References
 Results

Mens European Volleyball Championship, 1955
1955 in Romanian sport
International volleyball competitions hosted by Romania
June 1955 sports events in Europe
Sports competitions in Bucharest
1950s in Bucharest